The Udai or Udaj is a river in Ukraine, a right tributary of the Sula, in the basin of Dnieper.

The Udai finds its source near the village of Rozhnivka in Pryluky Raion, Chernihiv Oblast. The river flows through the Dnieper Lowland, within the Chernihiv Oblast and the Poltava Oblast. It is predominantly fed by melting snow (nival regime). It freezes between November and early January, and it stays under the ice until March to mid April.

The towns of Pryluky and Pyriatyn lie on the Udai, as well as the urban-type settlements of Dihtiari, Varva, Ladan, and the village(selo) of Pisky-Udajsjki.

Tributaries
Left: Burymnya, Ichenka, Radkivka, Smosh, Utka, Lysohir, Varva, Zhuravka, Mnoha.
Right: Halka, Yushchenkova, Stavka, Perevid, Vilshanka.

References

Geographical Encyclopedia of Ukraine: 3 t. / Editorial Board: O. M. Marinych (repl. Ed.) And others. - K.: "Ukrainian Soviet Encyclopedia" by them. M.P. Bazhana, 1989.
Encyclopedia of Ukrainian Studies: Dictionary part: [in 11 vols] / Scientific society named after Shevchenko; Goal. Ed. Prof. Dr. Volodymyr Kubiyovych. - Paris; New York: Young Life; Lviv; Kyiv: Globus, 1955–2003.
Hydrochemistry of the rivers of the Left Bank forest-steppe / Ed. VK Khilchevsky, VA Stashuk. - K .: Nika-Center, 2014. - 230 p. 
Lozovitsky P.S. Environmental assessment of the quality of the water of the upper Uday as a basis for the organization of monitoring of the ecosystems of the national natural parks of the basin [Text] / P.S. Lozovitsky / / Protected case 2016. - No. 1 (22). - with. 21-35
Priluki.info

Rivers of Chernihiv Oblast
Rivers of Poltava Oblast